The 2020–21 NK Osijek season was the club's 107th season in existence and the 30th consecutive season in the top flight of Croatian football.

Players

Transfers

In

Out

 Total Spending: €4,400,000

 Total Income: €7,810,000

 Net Income: €3,410,000

Competitions

Overview

HT Prva liga

League table

Results summary

Results by round

Matches 

Source: Croatian Football Federation

Croatian Football Cup

Source: Croatian Football Federation

UEFA Europa League

Source: uefa.com

Friendlies

Pre-season

Mid-season

Player seasonal records
Updated 23 May 2021.

Goals

Source: Competitive matches

Clean sheets

Source: Competitive matches

Disciplinary record

Appearances and goals

Notes

References

External links

NK Osijek seasons
Osijek